Adesmus is a genus of longhorn beetles of the subfamily Lamiinae, containing the following species:

 Adesmus acanga Galileo & Martins, 1999
 Adesmus acangauna Martins & Galileo, 2004
 Adesmus albiventris (Bates, 1881)
 Adesmus basalis Fuchs, 1970
 Adesmus bicolor (Gahan, 1889)
 Adesmus bisellatus (Bates, 1881)
 Adesmus borgmeieri (Lane, 1976)
 Adesmus brunneiceps (Aurivillius, 1920)
 Adesmus calca Galileo & Martins, 2005
 Adesmus chalumeaui Touroult, 2004
 Adesmus charis (Bates, 1881)
 Adesmus clathratus (Gistel, 1848)
 Adesmus collaris Melzer, 1931
 Adesmus colligatus (Redtenbacher, 1867)
 Adesmus diana (Thomson, 1860)
 Adesmus dignus Melzer, 1931
 Adesmus divus (Chabrillac, 1857)
 Adesmus facetus Martins & Galileo, 2008
 Adesmus fortunei Lingafelter, 2013
 Adesmus fulvicornis (Bates, 1881)
 Adesmus griseus (Aurivillius, 1900)
 Adesmus guttatus Galileo & Martins, 2005
 Adesmus hemispilus (Germar, 1821)
 Adesmus hipposiderus Galileo & Martins, 2005
 Adesmus hovorei Martins & Galileo, 2004
 Adesmus icambi Martins & Galileo, 2009
 Adesmus juninensis Galileo & Martins, 1999
 Adesmus laetus (Bates, 1881)
 Adesmus leucodryas (Bates, 1881)
 Adesmus meinerti (Aurivillius, 1900)
 Adesmus monnei Galileo & Martins, 2009
 Adesmus moruna Martins & Galileo, 2008
 Adesmus mosapyra Galileo & Martins, 2006
 Adesmus murutinga Martins & Galileo, 2004
 Adesmus nevisi (Gounelle, 1909)
 Adesmus nigriventris (Fleutiaux & Sallé, 1889)
 Adesmus nigrocinctus (Gahan, 1889)
 Adesmus nigrolineatus Martins & Galileo, 2008
 Adesmus niveiceps (Aurivillius, 1900)
 Adesmus ocellatus Galileo & Martins, 2005
 Adesmus paradiana Galileo & Martins, 2004
 Adesmus phoebinus (Aurivillius, 1900)
 Adesmus pilatus Galileo & Martins, 2005
 Adesmus pirauna Galileo & Martins, 1999
 Adesmus pluricostatus (Bates, 1881)
 Adesmus postilenatus (Bates, 1881)
 Adesmus pulchellus Galileo & Martins, 1999
 Adesmus pysasu Galileo & Martins, 1999
 Adesmus quadricinctus Galileo & Martins, 1999
 Adesmus sannio Melzer, 1931
 Adesmus seabrai Lane, 1959
 Adesmus sexguttatus (Lucas, 1857)
 Adesmus sexlineatus (Bates, 1881)
 Adesmus stellatus Galileo & Martins, 2005
 Adesmus stephanus (Aurivillius, 1900)  
 Adesmus temporalis (Aurivillius, 1908)
 Adesmus tribalteatus (Bates, 1881)
 Adesmus turrialba Galileo & Martins, 1999
 Adesmus urubu Galileo & Martins, 1999
 Adesmus ventralis (Gahan, 1894)
 Adesmus verticalis (Germar, 1824)
 Adesmus vilhena Galileo & Martins, 1999
 Adesmus vulcanicus Galileo & Martins, 1999
 Adesmus windsori Martins & Galileo, 2004

References

 
Cerambycidae genera